This is a list of rulers of Bengal. For much of its history, Bengal was split up into several independent kingdoms, completely unifying only several times. In ancient times, Bengal consisted of the kingdoms of Pundra, Suhma, Vanga, Samatata and Harikela.

In the 4th century BCE, during the reign of the Nanda Empire, the powerful rulers of Gangaridai sent their forces with the war elephants which led the withdrawal of Alexander the Great from the Indian subcontinent.

As a province of the Mauryan Empire, much of Bengal was part of it except for the far eastern Bengali kingdoms which maintained friendly relationships with Ashoka. The kingdoms of Bengal continued to exist as tributary states before succumbing to the Guptas. With the fall of the Gupta Empire, Bengal was united under a single local ruler, King Shashanka, for the first time. With the collapse of his kingdom, Bengal split up into petty kingdoms once more.

With the rise of Gopala in 750 AD, Bengal was united once more under the Hindu Buddhist Pala Empire .The Pala period is considered as one of golden eras of bengali history as it brought stability and prosperity to Bengal after centuries of Civil War, created outstanding works of art and architecture ,proto- bengali language develop under them including its first literary work, the Charyapada and so on .Until the 12th century than being succeeded by the Hindu Chandra dynasty, Sena dynasty and deva dynasty. The rule of deva dynasty was a period ofpeace,propersity and creative excellence and may be designed as "golden age" After them, Bengal was ruled by the Hindu Maharajas of kingdoms such as Chandradwip and Cooch Behar.

In the early 13th century, Muhammad bin Bakhtiyar Khalji conquered Western and part of Northern Bengal, and established the first Muslim kingdom in Bengal. The Islamic Mamluk Sultanate, the Khalji dynasty, the Turko-Indian Tughlaq dynasty, the Sayyid dynasty and the Lodi dynasty ruled Bengal for over 320 years. Notable was Malik Altunia's reign with his wife Razia Sultana, the only female sovereign ruler.

Following Delhi Sultanate's reign, the Bengal Sultanate, a major trading nation in the world, was founded by Shamsuddin Ilyas Shah, and ruled by the Ilyas Shahi dynasty, succeeded by the Hussain Shahi dynasty founded by Alauddin Husain Shah, which saw the extension of the sultanate to the port of Chittagong, witnessing the arrival of the earliest Portuguese merchants.

After being absorbed to the Bengal Subah by Babur in the 16th century during the defeat of Sultan Nasiruddin Nasrat Shah in the Battle of Ghaghra, Bengal started to be ruled by the Subahdars of the Mughal Empire. Emperor Akbar began to preach the newly invented religion of Din-i Ilahi, which was declared by the Qadi of Bengal to be a blasphemy. Islam Khan I declared Dhaka as the capital of Bengal, which was then known as Jahangir Nagar, renamed after emperor Jahangir. The reign of prince Shah Shuja under emperor Shah Jahan's orders represented the height of Mughal architecture.

After the decline of the Mughal Empire, the Nawabs of Bengal and Murshidabad ruled over Bengal and Odisha. Nawab Alivardi Khan came victorious against the Maratha Empire in the  Battle of Burdwan. Following the Battle of Plassey and the execution of Siraj ud-Daulah, the East India Company formally established control over Bengal, and the Bengal Presidency was established by Robert Clive, with the subdivision remaining the economic, cultural and educational hub of the Company and the Raj.

The position of the Prime Minister of Bengal was established in 1937, being held by A. K. Fazlul Huq and Huseyn Shaheed Suhrawardy. After the Indian independence movement and Partition of Bengal (1947), the West Bengal became a major state of the Republic of India, while the Muslim majority East Bengal became known as East Pakistan. In 1971 East Bengal became an independent nation, Bangladesh, following the Bangladesh Liberation War, governed by Sheikh Mujibur Rahman, Ziaur Rahman and Hussain Muhammad Ershad.

Ancient Bengal

Ancient geopolitical divisions 

The founders of Angas, Vangas, Kalingas, Pundras, Odras and Suhmas shared a common ancestry. They were all adopted sons of a king named Bali, born by a sage named Gautama Dirghatamas, who lived in Magadha close to the city of Girivraja.

Bengal from c. 1100 to c. 600 BCE

Bengal from c. 600 to c. 350 BCE

Bengal in c. 350 BCE

Anga kingdom (c. 1100 – 530 BCE) 

The earliest mention occurs in the Atharvaveda (V.22.14) where they are listed alongside the Magadhas, Gandharis and the Mujavatas.
Anga was annexed by Magadha in the time of Bimbisara. This was the one and only conquest of Bimbisara.

Known Anga rulers are-
 Maharaj Anga - (founder of the kingdom and son of King Bali)
 Romapada
 Brihadratha
 Angaraj Karna
 Vrishaketu - (son of Karna)
 Tamralipta 
 Lomapada
 Chitraratha
 Vrihadratha
 Vasuhoma
 Dhatarattha
 Dhadivahana
 Brahmadatta - (last king of Anga kingdom)

Vanga kingdom (c. 1100 – 340 BCE) 

Vanga was an ancient kingdom and geopolitical division on the Ganges delta. It was located in southern Bengal, with the core region including present-day southwestern Bangladesh and southern West Bengal (India).

Known Vanga rulers are:
 Samudrasena
 Chadrasena
 Karna
 Bhagabhatta

Pundra kingdom (c. 1100 – 340 BCE) 

Pundravardhana or Pundra Kingdom, was an ancient kingdom, that included parts of present-day Rajshahi and Rangpur Divisions of Bangladesh as well as the West Dinajpur district of West Bengal in India.

Known Pundra rulers are:
 Paundraka Vasudeva

Suhma kingdom (c. 1100 – 340 BCE) 

Suhma Kingdom was an ancient state during the Vedic period on the eastern part of the Bengal.This kingdom was mentioned in the epic Mahabharata along with its neighbouring kingdom Prasuhma.

Videha dynasty of Mithila (Tirabhukti) (c. 1100 – 700 BCE) 

Tirabhukti or Mithila region is bounded by the Mahananda River in the east, the Ganges in the south, the Gandaki River in the west and by the foothills of the Himalayas in the north.

Mithila region firstly ruled by Videha dynasty. There were 52 Janaka (kings) ruled Videha dynasty of Mithila-

 Mithi - (founder of Mithila and the first Janaka)
 Udavasu
 Nandivardhana
 Suketu
 Devarata
 Brihadvrata
 Mahavira
 Sudhriti
 Dristaketu
 Haryasva
 Maru
 Pratindhaka
 Kritiratha
 Devamidha
 Vibhuta
 Mahidhrata
 Kirtirata
 Mahorama
 Swarnorama
 Hrisvaroma
 Seeradhwaja
 Bhaanumaan
 Shatadyumn
 Shuchi
 Oorjnaamaa
 Kriti
 Anjan
 Kurujit
 Arishtnemi
 Shrutaayu
 Supaarshwa
 Srinjaya
 Kshemaavee
 Anenaa
 Bhaumarath
 Satyarath
 Upagu
 Upagupt
 Swaagat
 Swaanand
 Suvarchaa
 Supaarshwa
 Subhaash
 Sushrut
 Jaya
 Vijaya
 Rit
 Sunaya
 Veetahavya
 Dhriti
 Bahulaashwa
 Kriti - (last King of Videha or Janaka dynasty, Kirti Janak was atrocious ruler who lost control over his subjects. He was dethroned by public under leadership of Acharyas (Learned Men).

During this period of fall of Videha dynasty, the famous republic of Licchavi was rising in Vaishali and Mithila region came under control of Licchavi clan of Vajji confederacy in around eight century BCE.

Gangaridai kingdom (c. 350 – 100 BCE) 

Gangaridae is a term used by the ancient Greco-Roman writers to describe a people or a geographical region of the ancient Indian subcontinent. Some of these writers state that Alexander the Great withdrew from the Indian subcontinent because of the strong war elephant force of the Gangaridai. However, the geographical region was annexed and governed by the Nanda Empire at the time.

A number of modern scholars locate Gangaridai in the Ganges Delta of the Bengal region, although alternative theories also exist. Gange or Ganges, the capital of the Gangaridai (according to Ptolemy), has been identified with several sites in the region, including Chandraketugarh and Wari-Bateshwar.

Magadha dynasties of Bengal

Brihadratha dynasty (c. 1700 – 682 BCE) 

Rulers-

(Ripunjaya was the last ruler of dynasty, dethorned by Pradyota in 682 BCE)

Pradyota dynasty (c. 682 – 544 BCE) 

Rulers-

(Varttivarddhana was last ruler of dynasty dethroned by Bimbisara in 544 BCE)

Haryanka dynasty (c. 544 – 413 BCE) 

Rulers-

(Nāgadāsaka was last ruler of dynasty overthrowed by Shishunaga in 413 BCE)

Shishunaga dynasty (c. 413 – 345 BCE) 

Rulers-

(Mahanandin lost his empire by his illegitimate son Mahapadma Nanda in 345 BCE)

Nanda Empire (c. 345 – 322 BCE) 

Rulers-

(Dhana Nanda lost his empire to Chandragupta Maurya after being defeated by him in 322 BCE)

Maurya Empire (c. 322 – 184 BCE) 

Rulers-

(Brihadratha was the last ruler of dynasty, dethroned by Pushyamitra Shunga  in 185 BCE)

Shunga Empire (c. 185 – 73 BCE) 

Rulers-

(Devabhuti was the last ruler of dynasty dethroned by, dethroned Vasudeva Kanva in 73 BCE)

Kanva dynasty (c. 73 – 28 BCE) 

Rulers-

(Susarman was the last ruler of dynasty, dethroned by Simuka of Satavahana Empire)

Classical Era

Chandra dynasty (c. 202 – 1050 CE)

The Chandra Kingdom was a Kayastha kingdom, which ruled the Samatata region of Bengal, as well as northern Arakan. Later it was a neighbor to the Pala Empire to the north. Rulers of Chandra kingdom were followers of Hinduism.

Rulers-

Gupta Empire (c. 240 – 550 CE) 

Rulers-
 Sri-Gupta I (240–280), founder of dynasty
 Ghatotkacha (280–319)
 Chandra Gupta I (320–335)
 Samudra Gupta (335–380)
 Rama Gupta (6 Months)
 Chandra Gupta II (Chandragupta Vikramaditya) (380–413/415)
 Kumara Gupta I (415–455)
 Skanda Gupta (455–467)
 Puru Gupta(467–473)
 Kumara Gupta II (473–476)
 Buddha Gupta (476–495)
 Narasimha Gupta(495–550)
 Kumara Gupta III (500–540)
 Vishnugupta (540–550), last imperial Gupta ruler.

Jaintia kingdom (c. 525 – 1835 CE)

Old dynasty rulers 
Urmi Rani (?–550)
Krishak Pator (550–570)
Hatak (570–600)
Guhak (600–630)

Partitioned Jaintia rulers 
Jayanta (630–660)
Joymalla (660–?)
Mahabal (?)
Bancharu (?–1100)
Kamadeva (1100–1120)
Bhimbal (1120)

Brahmin dynasty rulers 
Kedareshwar Rai (1120–1130)
Dhaneshwar Rai (1130–1150)
Kandarpa Rai (1150–1170)
Manik Rai (1170–1193)
Jayanta Rai (1193–1210)
Jayanti Devi
Bara Gossain

New dynasty rulers 
Prabhat Ray Syiem Sutnga (1500–1516)
Majha Gosain Syiem Sutnga (1516–1532)
Burha Parbat Ray Syiem Sutnga (1532–1548)
Bar Gosain Syiem Sutnga I (1548–1564)
Bijay Manik Syiem Sutnga (1564–1580)
Pratap Ray Syiem Sutnga (1580–1596)
Dhan Manik Syiem Sutnga (1596–1612)
Jasa Manik Syiem Sutnga (1612–1625)
Sundar Ray Syiem Sutnga (1625–1636)
Chota Parbat Ray Syiem Sutnga (1636–1647)
Jasamanta Ray Syiem Sutnga (1647–1660)
Ban Singh Syiem Sutnga (1660–1669)
Pratap Singh Syiem Sutnga (1669–1678)
Lakshmi Narayan Syiem Sutnga (1678–1694)
Ram Singh Syiem Sutnga I (1694–1708)
Jay Narayan Syiem Sutnga (1708–1731)
Bar Gosain Syiem Sutnga II (1731–1770)
Chattra Singh Syiem Sutnga (1770–1780)
Yatra Narayan Syiem Sutnga (1780-1785)
Bijay Narayan Syiem Sutnga (1785–1786)
Lakshmi Singh Syiem Sutnga (1786-1790)
Ram Singh Syiem Sutnga II (1790–1832)
Rajendra Singh Syiem Sutnga (1832–1835)

Gauda kingdom (c. 550 – 626 CE) 

Rulers-
 Early Gaunda rulers are unknown
 Shashanka (590–625), first recorded independent Hindu king of Bengal, created the first unified political entity in Bengal.
 Manava (625–626), ruled for 8 months before being conquered by Harshavardana and Bhaskarvarmana in 626 CE.

Pushyabhuti (Vardhana) Empire (c. 606 – 647 CE) 

Rulers of Bengal-
 Harshavardhana (606–647), unified Northern India and ruled it for over 40 years, he was the last non-Muslim emperor to rule a unified Northern India

Khadga dynasty (c. 625 – 730 CE) 

Rulers-

Bhadra dynasty (6th to 7th century) 

The Bhadra dynasty was a Bengali Hindu royal house of Brahmin origin, their rule flourished during the first half of the 7th century, though little is known about their history. The kings of the dynasty bore names with the suffix "Bhadra".

Known rulers are-
 Narayanabhadra
 Jyeshthabhadra

Mallabhum kingdom (c. 694 – 1947 CE) 

Rulers-

Post-Classical era

Pala Empire (c. 750 – 1161 CE) 

Most of the Pala inscriptions mention only the regnal year as the date of issue, without any well-known calendar era. Because of this, the chronology of the Pala kings is hard to determine. Based on their different interpretations of the various epigraphs and historical records, different historians estimate the Pala chronology as follows:

Sena dynasty (c. 1070 – 1230 CE) 

Sena dynasty ruled southwestern Bengal from 1070 and ruled East Bengal until 1230. Vijaya Sena conquered entire Bengal by 1154 CE.

Rulers-
Hemanta Sena (1070–1096)
Vijaya Sena (1096–1159)
Ballala Sena (1159–1179)
Lakshmana Sena (1179–1206)
Vishvarupa Sena (1206–1225)
Keshava Sena (1225–1230)

Deva dynasty (c. 1150 – 1294 CE) 

List of rulers is disputed-
 Purushottamadeva
 Madhusudanadeva
 Vasudeva
 Shantideva
 Viradeva
 Anandadeva
 Bhavadeva
 Damodaradeva (1231–1243)
 Dasharathadeva (1243–1281)
 Vikramadityadeva (1281–1294)

Delhi Sultanate period

Khalji dynasty 
The Khalji dynasty of Bengal (c.1203–27) were initially representatives of the Ghurid Empire, later becoming independent, although at times being subordinate to the Delhi Sultanate.

Governors of Bengal under Mamluk dynasty (1227–1287)
Governors of Bengal under the Mamluk dynasty of the Delhi Sultanate.

House of Balban 
The House of Balban (c.1287–1324) came about as a result of Mamluk governor Nasiruddin Bughra Khan declaring independence.

Governors of Bengal under Tughlaq dynasty (1324–1338)

Bengal Sultanate era

Independent Sultans of Bengal during Tughlaq dynasty (1338–1352)

Ilyas Shahi dynasty (1352–1414)

House of Raja Ganesha (1414–1435)

Restored Ilyas Shahi dynasty (1435–1487)

Habshi rule (1487–1494)

Hussain Shahi dynasty (1494–1538)

Governors of Bengal under Sur Empire (1532–1556)

Muhammad Shah dynasty (1554–1564)

Karrani dynasty (1564–1576)

Mughal Subahdars of Bengal Subah (1574–1717)

During the reign of Akbar

During the reign of Jahangir

During the reign of Shah Jahan

During the reign of Aurangzeb

Medieval Hindu dynasties of Bengal

Koch dynasty (c. 1515 – 1949 CE)

Rulers of undivided Koch dynasty (c. 1515 – 1586 CE) 
 Biswa Singha (1515–1540 CE)
 Nara Narayan (1540–1586 CE)

Rulers of Koch Bihar (c. 1586 – 1949) 

 Lakshmi Narayan
 Bir Narayan
 Pran Narayan
 Basudev Narayan
 Mahindra Narayan
 Roop Narayan
 Upendra Narayan
 Devendra Narayan
 Dhairjendra Narayan
 Rajendra Narayan
 Dharendra Narayan
 Harendra Narayan
 Shivendra Narayan
 Narendra Narayan
 Nripendra Narayan
 Rajendra Narayan II
 Jitendra Narayan (father of Gayatri Devi)
 Jagaddipendra Narayan (ruled till 1949)

Kingdom of Bhurshut (c. 16th–18th century) 

 Maharaja Shivanarayan 
Maharaja Rudranarayan, Maharaja (16th century)
Bhavashankari, Maharani (16th century)
Pratapnarayan, Maharaja (17th century)
Naranarayan, Maharaja (17th century)
Lakshminarayan, Maharaja (c. 1695–1712)

Kingdom of Chandradweep Or  Basu Dynasty 

Chandradweep Ruled By

Raja Paramananda Basu
Raja Jagganath Basu
Kandarpanarayan Basu ( 1582-1598)
Ramchandra Basu
Kirtinarayan Basu
Basudebnarayan Basu
Pratapnarayan Basu

Maharajas of Jessore region 
Known rulers are-
 Pratapaditya

Maharaja of Lower Bengal region 
Known rulers are
 Raja Sitaram Ray (1688–1714 CE)

Maharaja of Bhawal region 

Rulers of Gazipur and Madhupur forest are in central Bangladesh.

Nawabs of Bengal

Independent Nawabs of Bengal (1717–1757 CE)

Nawabs of Bengal under East India Company (1757–1838 CE)

Nawabs of Murshidabad

East India Company governors in Bengal

Governors of British East India Company in Bengal (1757–1793)
 Robert Clive 1757 – 1760
 Henry Vansittart 1760 – 1764
 Robert Clive (again) 1765 – 1766
 Harry Verelst 1767 – 1769
 John Cartier 1769 – 1772
 Warren Hastings 1772 – 1773 see below
As per the treaty of Allahabad in 1765, the British East India Company (BEIC) was given the right to collect revenue (Diwani right). From 1769, the company collected revenue from Bengal.

Governors-General of British East India Company in Bengal – Dual government (1773–1774) 
Following the Regulating Act of 1773, the Governor of Bengal was officially called Governor-General of Fort William.
 Warren Hastings 1773 see above – 1774
 Charles Cornwallis 1786 – 1793

Governors-General of British East India Company in Bengal (1793–1854) 
In 1793, the British East India Company abolished Nizamat, i.e. local rule by Mughal emperor- appointed Nawabs and annexed Bengal.
 Sir John Shore 1793 – 1798
 Richard Wellesley 1798 – 1805
 Charles Cornwallis 1805 – 1805
 Sir George Barlow, 1st Baronet 1805 – 1807
 Gilbert Elliot-Murray-Kynynmound, 1st Earl of Minto 1807 – 1813
 Francis Rawdon-Hastings, 1st Marquess of Hastings 1813 – 1823
 John Adam 1823 – 1823
 William Amherst, 1st Earl Amherst 1823 – 1828
 William Butterworth Bayley 1828 – 1828
 Lord William Bentinck 1828 – 1833

Governor-Generals of British East India Company (1833–1858) 
As per Charter Act of 1833, the Governor-General of Bengal would be called Governor-General of India
 Lord William Bentinck 1833 – 1835
 Charles Metcalfe, 1st Baron Metcalfe 1835 – 1836
 George Eden 1836 – 1842
 Edward Law 1842 – 1844
 William Bird 1844 – 1844
 Henry Hardinge 1844 – 1848
 James Broun-Ramsay 1848 – 1856
 The Viscount Canning 1856 – 1858

British Raj era

With the establishment of the Empire of India in 1858, the position of Governor-General was replaced with Governor-General and Viceroy of India. Calcutta, the capital of Bengal also became the capital of India. As a result, the position of Lieutenant-Governor of Bengal was established to look after provincial matters.

Lieutenant-Governors (1858–1912)
 Frederick James Halliday 1858–1859
 John Grant 1859–1862
 Sir Cecil Beadon 1862–1866
 Sir William Grey 1866–1871
 George Campbell 1871–1874
 Sir Richard Temple 1874–1877
 Sir Ashley Eden 1877–1879
 Steuart Bayley 1879–1882
 Sir Augustus Thompson 1882–1885
 Horace Cockerell 1885–1887
 Sir Steuart Bayley 1887–1890
 Charles Eliott 1890–1893
 Anthony MacDonnell 1893–1895
 Alexander Mackenzie 1895–1897
 Charles Cecil Stevens 1897–1898
 Sir John Woodburn 1898–1902
 James Bourdillon 1902–1903
 Sir Andrew Fraser 1903–1906
 Lancelot Hare 1906–1906
 Francis Slacke 1906–1908
 Sir Edward Baker 1908–1911
 Sir William Duke 1911–1912

Governors (1912–1947)
In late 1911, the Indian Government decided to move the capital to New Delhi. As a result, the Governorship of Bengal Presidency was now necessary.

Prime Minister of Bengal (1937–1947)

The Government of India Act 1935 introduced provincial autonomy in India and the position of Chief Minister or Premier of Bengal became very prominent.

Office holders

Subsequently, all three Bengali chief ministers moved to East Pakistan, where they continued to be influential statesmen. Nazimuddin and Suhrawardy became Prime Ministers of Pakistan, while Huq served as the Chief Minister and Governor of East Pakistan.

After Independence of India and Pakistan
British colonial period ended when India and Pakistan became independent nations in 1947. Bengal fell into two parts – one in India, named West Bengal and the other part in Pakistan as East Bengal, later renamed to East Pakistan in 1955.

Pakistani (East) Bengal (1947–1971)

Governors of East Bengal (1947–1955)

Chief Minister of East Bengal (1947–1955)

Governors of East Pakistan (1955–1971)
In late 1954, the prime minister Muhammad Ali Bogra initiated the One Unit policy which resulted in East Bengal province being renamed to East Pakistan.

Chief Minister of East Pakistan (1955–1971)

On 7 October 1958, the post of Chief Minister of East Pakistan was abolished. And after the independence of Bangladesh on 16 December 1971, the province of East Pakistan was dissolved.

Indian (West) Bengal (1947–present)

Governors of West Bengal

Chief Ministers of West Bengal

After independence of Bangladesh 
East Pakistan seceded from West Pakistan on 16 December 1971 after the end of Bangladesh Liberation War and was named Bangladesh as an independent nation.

The President was the executive Head of state of Bangladesh during Presidential system of government from 1975 to 1991. Thereafter, the Prime Minister is the executive head of government of this parliamentary republic while the President is the ceremonial Head of state, elected by the parliament.

Key
Political parties

Other factions

Status

Presidents of Bangladesh

Prime Ministers of Bangladesh

See also 
 Bengal
 Magadha
 Vedic Period
 Mahajanapadas
 Bengali Hindus
 History of Bengal
 History of India
 History of Bangladesh
 History of West Bengal
 List of Indian monarchs

Notes

References

Sources 
 
 
 

Dynasties of Bengal
Bengal